A Girl Can Mack is the second studio album by American girl group 3LW. A follow-up to their self-titled debut album (2000), it was released by Epic Records on October 22, 2002. With A Girl Can Mack, the group attempted to shed their youthful image and craft a mature look. The album combines both ballads and upbeat songs, with several serving as a declaration of equality in romantic relationships. The album was considered at lot "racier" and sexier than their debut.

Background

3LW spent the first half of 2002 in the studio, recording a follow-up to their eponymous debut album. Their second album, tentatively titled Same Game, Different Rules, was set to be released mid-2002, and its lead single "Uh Oh" was presented to the label, who felt it did not have enough urban radio appeal. The tracks from Same Game, Different Rules were leaked to the Internet in MP3 format, and Epic considered dropping the girls. A fan support campaign for 3LW named 'Never Let Go Of 3LW' (after their song "Never Let Go") gained traction, and the act was retained, although Same Game, Different Rules remained shelved.

Recording a new set of tracks, the group returned in the summer of 2002 with the P. Diddy-produced single "I Do (Wanna Get Close To You)", featuring Loon in June. That same summer, the group performed a concert special on Nickelodeon titled Live on Sunset.

Critical reception
AllMusic found that A Girl Can Mack "proves that these girls can also sing. Production, courtesy of P. Diddy, the Full Force crew, and Mario Winans, among others, is witty and imaginative." The website further remarked that the album was "divided between such club fare and slinky, sexy cuts such as "This Goes Out" and the deep after-hours soul of "Good Good Girl," and the [3LW] prove here they're adept at covering both bases." Natasha Washington, writing for The Oklahoman wrote that A Girl Can Mack "shows a mature 3LW." She noted that the band "adds high-energy dance tracks such as "Leave" and "Meet Me at the Crib," while ballads including "Crazy" and "More Than Friends" showcase sultry vocals and lush melodies."

Naughton's departure and album release

By the summer of 2002, when the group was set to release A Girl Can Mack, member Naturi Naughton had left the group, alleging that she had a number of conflicts and arguments with Bailon, Williams, and their management, which led to a heated argument in August 2002 involving an altercation with KFC food. Not long after, Naughton claimed that she was forced out of the group.

Williams and Bailon continued as a duo while using the "3LW" name, causing the press to jokingly refer to them as "2LW".  According to a cover story for the October 2002 issue of Sister 2 Sister magazine, Williams and Bailon said they received death threats and that they had to beef up security. The departure of Naughton greatly affected the group's popularity and album sales. A Girl Can Macks release date was pushed back a month, but sales were still disappointing debuting at No. 15 on the Billboard 200 with a disappointing 53,000 copies sold in the first week. By March 2003 the album had sold 176,000 copies in the US. After the second single released from the album, "Neva Get Enuf", underperformed, auditions were held across the country for a new third member. Jessica Benson made the cut and joined 3LW in early 2003.

Track listingSample credits'
 "Neva Get Enuf" contains a sample of "Close the Door" as performed by Teddy Pendergrass.
 "Funny" contains a sample of "Funny How Time Flies (When You're Having Fun)" by Janet Jackson.

Unreleased/Leaked Tracks

Charts

Release history

References

2002 albums
3LW albums
Albums produced by 88-Keys